Ürümqi (also spelled Urumqi or Urumchi), formerly known as Dihua (also spelled Tihwa), is the capital of the Xinjiang Uyghur Autonomous Region in the far northwest of the People's Republic of China. Ürümqi developed its reputation as a leading cultural and commercial center during the Qing dynasty in the 19th century.

With a census population of 4 million in 2020, Ürümqi is the second-largest city in China's northwestern interior after Xi'an as well as the largest in Central Asia in terms of population. According to the Guinness Book of Records, Ürümqi is the most remote city from any sea in the world. Ürümqi has seen significant economic development since the 1990s and currently serves as a regional transport node and a cultural, political and commercial center.

Ürümqi is one of the top 500 cities in the world by scientific research output, as tracked by the Nature Index. The city is also home to Xinjiang University, a comprehensive university with the highest academic level in Xinjiang, under the Project 211 and the Double First Class University Plan.

Etymology 
The name "Ürümqi" comes from the Mongolic Oirat language and means "beautiful pasture". It was originally the name of a small town founded by the Oirat-speaking Mongol Dzungar people.

The Qing dynasty took Ürümqi by force in 1755, during its conquest of the Dzungar Khanate. Qing forces expanded the town into a walled city from 1763 to 1767. Upon completing the expansion, the Qing renamed the city "Dihua" (previously romanized as "Tihwa"), which literally means "to enlighten and civilize". Believing the name "Dihua" to be belittling and ethnically chauvinist, the Chinese Communist Party restored the name "Ürümqi" on 1 February 1954.

History 

Although Ürümqi is situated near the northern route of the Silk Road, the present city is relatively new. The earliest known settlement in the area can be dated to the 7th century CE, but there was no permanent settlement for a long period and it was not known as Ürümqi until the Dzungar Khanate in the 17th century. The current city dates from the rebuilding started in the 18th century.

Early period 
During the area's prehistory, the Jushi Kingdom was established by a nomadic people who lived on the northern slopes of the Tianshan Mountains.

Under the name "Luntai", the city was established near Urabo by the Tang government during the 22nd year of Emperor Taizong's reign (648 AD), as part of the Protectorate General to Pacify the West that controlled Xinjiang. It was a seat of local government and collected taxes from the caravans along the northern route of the Silk Road.

After the Tang retreated from the Western Regions, the region came under the control of the Uyghurs of the Khaganate and Gaochang / Qocho.  There is little information about the Ürümqi area during the time between the Tang and Qing dynasties, and researchers believe that there was no permanent settlements there for most of this period. The Mongols referred to the wider area as Bishbalik, meaning five cities, a reference to the five towns that surrounded the present-day Ürümqi area.

Dzungar period
The Oirat-speaking Dzungar tribes that formed the Dzungar Khanate were the last major power to control Ürümqi before the Manchus gained control of Xinjiang. During the Ming dynasty, there was a record of a place at Jiujiawan  to the west of present Ürümqi, which may have been the Dzungar town that was later destroyed during the Qing conquest. The Mongolians also used the area as herding ground in this period. Steppe peoples had used the location, the pass between the Bogda Shan to the east and the Tian Shan to the west, connecting the Dzungar Basin to the north and the Turpan Depression to the south.

Ürümqi remained a small town of lesser importance than the oasis and Silk Road trade center Turpan  to the southeast. Fighting for the control of Dzungaria led to the Khoshuuts (now classified as Mongols) leaving Ürümqi for Qinghai and Tibet in the 1620s and 1630s. The Uyghurs were introduced into the Ürümqi area in the 18th century by the Dzungars who moved them from the west Tarim region to be taranchis or farmers in Ürümqi.

Qing rule
In the 18th century, the Qing went to war against the Dzungar Khanate. Ürümqi was taken by the Qing in 1755, and the Dzungars of the region were eliminated in the Dzungar genocide. One writer, Wei Yuan, described the resulting desolation in what became northern Xinjiang as "an empty plain for a thousand li, with no trace of man". A fort was built (either in 1755 or 1758 depending on sources), and the Qing then established garrisons of Manchu and Mongol bannermen and Han Chinese troops at Ürümqi. After 1759, the Qing government established state farms in the under-populated areas around Ürümqi, where there was fertile, well-watered land. Manchu soldiers also constructed a temple with red walls dedicated to Guandi on Pingding mountain overlooking Ürümqi, which gave Ürümqi the nickname "Red Temple".

The Manchus began to construct a walled city in 1763 to the south of the first fort, and it was completed in 1767. The Qianlong Emperor named the new settlement "Dihua" (Manchu: Wen de dahabure fu), meaning "to enlighten and civilize". In 1771, another city named Gongning Cheng was built nearby to the northwest to house Manchu bannermen, and this would become the seat of government. The bannermen settlement to the west was commonly referred to as "Mancheng", while Dihua to the east became a Han Chinese town commonly called "Hancheng". The Ürümqi of the early period was therefore a twin-city, with Gongning Cheng as the administrative center while Dihua grew into Xinjiang's commercial and financial center.

Han Chinese from all over China moved into Dihua, as did Chinese Hui Muslims from Gansu and Shaanxi. The origin of Hui in Ürümqi is often indicated by the names of their mosques. By 1762, more than 500 shops had already been opened by Chinese migrants to the area of modern-day Ürümqi. Those Qing literati who visited Dihua were impressed by its cultural sophistication and similarity to eastern China. The writer Ji Yun compared Dihua to Beijing, in that both had numerous wine shops which offered daily performances of Chinese music and dance.

In 1870, the Battle of Ürümqi took place between the Turkic Muslim forces of Yaqub Beg against the Dungan Muslim forces of Tuo Ming (Daud Khalifa). With the help of Xu Xuegong's Han Chinese militia, Yaqub Beg's forces defeated the Dungans. Gongning Cheng was captured, its Qing administrator killed, and the city burnt to the ground and abandoned. The Qing later regained control of Ürümqi. In 1884, the Guangxu Emperor established Xinjiang as a province, with Dihua as its capital.

Republican era
After the collapse of the Qing dynasty, Xinjiang was ruled from Ürümqi by a succession of warlords: Yang Zengxin (1911–1928), Jin Shuren (1928–1933), Sheng Shicai (1933–1942), and Zhang Zhizhong as governor of Xinjiang in 1942–1949. Of these, Yang and Sheng were considered capable rulers.
 
During the Kumul Rebellion, the Battle of Ürümqi (1933) and the Battle of Ürümqi (1933–34) took place between the forces of Ma Zhongying's 36th Division (National Revolutionary Army) and Jin Shuren and Sheng Shicai's provincial forces. At the second battle, Ma was assisted by the Han Chinese General Zhang Peiyuan.

People's Republic era
On 1 February 1954, following the founding of the People's Republic of China, the city's name was officially changed back to Ürümqi. The ruling Chinese Communist Party believed that the name "Dihua", which literally means "to enlighten and civilize", was belittling and ethnically chauvinist.

In the late 1970s, Deng Xiaoping relaxed China's tight control over Xinjiang, and Ürümqi benefited from the development of the oil and gas industry in Xinjiang.

New mosques were built in Ürümqi with financial assistance from the Chinese government. While the Chinese government implemented strict rules on religion in southern Xinjiang, the treatment of the Uyghurs and their religion in Ürümqi were more lax and permissive.

In May 1989, unrest in Ürümqi resulted in 150 injuries. In February 1997, bombings in Ürümqi following the Ghulja incident resulted in 20 deaths and scores of injuries.

July 2009 riots and subsequent unrest

In the largest eruption of ethnic violence in China in decades, there were riots in July 2009 between ethnic Han Chinese and Uyghurs. The New York Times reporter covering the riot described the violence as "clashes with riot police and Uyghurs rampaging through the city and killing Han civilians. Then, for at least three days, bands of Han vigilantes roamed Urumqi, attacking and killing Uyghurs." Before the riot broke out, young Uyghurs had marched through the city "to protest a case of judicial discrimination". According to official figures, most of the 197 killed in the riot were Han, a statement which New York Times reporter Edward Wong says is disputed by Uyghurs.

Geography 
The largest city in western China, Ürümqi has earned a place in the Guinness Book of Records as the most remote city from any sea in the world.

The location  in the southwestern suburbs of Ürümqi (Ürümqi County) was designated by local geography experts as the "center point of Asia" in 1992, and a monument to this effect was erected there in the 1990s. The site is a local tourist attraction.

Water supply
Although surrounded by deserts (the Gurbantünggüt in the north and the Taklamakan in the south), the Ürümqi area is naturally watered by a number of small rivers flowing from the snow-capped Tian Shan mountains: the main range of the Tian Shan in south of the city (Ürümqi County), and the Bogda Shan east of the city (Dabancheng District). A network consisting of thousands of miles of canals, reservoirs, and tunnels called karez, redistribute the water throughout the extensively irrigated area along the foothills of the mountain range. It is based on an ancient irrigation system built 2,000 years ago.

There are 20,000 glaciers in Xinjiang – nearly half of all the glaciers in China. Since the 1950s, Xinjiang's glaciers have retreated by between 21 percent to 27 percent due to global warming. Tianshan Glacier No. 1, origin of Ürümqi River, is the largest glacier near a major city in China, but has already split into two smaller glaciers.

As the Ürümqi region's population and economy are growing, the water demand exceeds the natural supply. To alleviate water shortages, the Irtysh–Ürümqi Canal was constructed in the first decade of the 21st century. The canal's main trunk terminates in the so-called  "Reservoir 500" in the far north-eastern suburbs of the city (on the border of Ürümqi's suburban Midong District and Fukang City). A new industrial area, called Ganquanbao Industrial Park, or Industrial New City 500 was being developed in 2009, west of the reservoir, relying on it for water supply. From the reservoir area water is further distributed over a network of canals throughout the lower Midong District.

Climate 
In Ürümqi, a continental cold semi-arid climate (Köppen climate classification BSk) prevails, with very large differences between summer and winter. The city is semi-arid, with its summers slightly wetter than its winters, yet sunny weather is much more likely in the warmer months, and relative humidity is the lowest during summer. With monthly percent possible sunshine ranging from 30 percent in December to 70 percent in August and September, the city receives 2,523 hours of bright sunshine annually.

Cityscape

Air quality and pollution

According to the National Environmental Analysis released by Tsinghua University and the Asian Development Bank in January 2013, Ürümqi is among the top ten cities in the world with the most air pollution. According to this report, seven of these cities are in China, including Taiyuan, Beijing, Lanzhou, Chongqing, Jinan, and Shijiazhuang (besides Ürümqi).

Blacksmith Institute mentioned Ürümqi in 2007 World's Worst Polluted Places caused by air pollution along with Linfen and Lanzhou, all in China. In 2008, Toronto Star listed Ürümqi as one of the Top Ten worst places to live in the world due to sulphurous pollution. Heavy haze is extremely common in winter, which frequently affects air traffic. Officials believed that severe winter air pollution in Ürümqi is mainly caused by energy-heavy industries and the outdated coal-firing winter heating system. 

According to a report by Department of Environmental Science and Engineering of Fudan University, the average PM2.5 and TSP concentrations in the winter of 2007 were 12 times higher than USA standard for PM2.5 and 3 times the National Ambient Air Quality Standard of China for TSP. The sulfur dioxide from industrial emissions mixed with the local anthropogenic aerosol with the transported soil dust from outside the city were the main sources of the high concentration of sulfate, one of the main factors causing the heavy air pollution over Ürümqi.

Timing of sunrise
Because of the use of a single time zone for all of China, in Ürümqi which is at a far western location in China, the sun is 2 hours and 10 minutes behind China Standard Time (CST = UTC+8). During early January the sun does not rise until 09:45 and it sets between 18:45 and 19:10 local time. In September and March the sun rises around 08:00, and sets around 19:45. However, in June the sun rises at about 06:25 and does not set until 21:45.

Administrative divisions 

Ürümqi currently comprises 8 county-level subdivisions: 7 districts and 1 county.

Demographics 

Ürümqi has been a multi-ethnic city from the time of the Qing conquest; in the early years, the Manchus lived in Gongning Cheng, Han Chinese in Dihua and various other ethnic groups such as the Hui, Uyghurs and others in the suburban districts. Muslims settled to the south of the walled-city of Dihua, and although the walls have since been demolished, the Muslims are still concentrated there. 

A census in 1787 showed that there were 114,348 Hui and Han in the prefectures of Zhenxi (which included Barköl and Hami) and Ürümqi. In Ürümqi city itself, there were 39,000 people in the 1880s and by the early 20th century, 50,000 people. Ürümqi in 1908 was said to have been inhabited by Uyghurs (then called Turkis), Chinese, Manchus and a few Mongols, with the Uyghurs estimated to comprise a quarter of the population.

In the People's Republic era, an active program to resettle Han population in Xinjiang was initiated. In 1960, there were 76,496 Uyghurs and 477,321 Han Chinese in Ürümqi.

According to the 2000 census, Ürümqi had 2,081,834 inhabitants, with a population density of 174.53 inhabitants/km2 (452.3 inhabitants/sq. mi.).

In the 2010 census, the population was recorded as 3,112,559. Part of the increase was due to boundary changes, for example, Miquan was merged into Midong District and became part of Ürümqi in 2007.

In 2021, Ürümqi was estimated to have a population of 4.544 million people.

Economy 

Ürümqi is a major industrial center within Xinjiang. Ürümqi, together with Karamay and Korla, account for 64.5 percent of the total industrial output of Xinjiang. Ürümqi is also the largest consumer center in the region, recording ¥41.9 billion retail sales of consumer goods in 2008, an increase of 26 percent from 2007. The GDP per capita reached US$6,222 in 2008. According to statistics, Ürümqi ranked 7th in 2008 by the disposable income for urban residents among cities in Western China. Ürümqi has been a central developmental target for the China Western Development project that the Central Government is pursuing.

The Ürümqi Foreign Economic Relations and Trade Fair has been held annually since 1991 and has been upgraded into the first China-Eurasia Expo in 2011. Its purpose is to promote domestic and foreign markets. The 17th Fair has attracted participants from the Ministry of Commerce and the China Council for Promotion of International Trade.

Xinjiang Guanghui Industry Investment Group is the largest real estate enterprise and most powerful privately owned company in Xinjiang and is currently engaged in energy and automobiles. Zhongshan Road (Sun Yat-sen Road) has been one of the ten most famous commercial streets in China since 2005. Zhongshan Road has always been the hub of consumer electronics in the city, with the largest computer, mobile phone and consumer electronics market in Xinjiang, including Baihuacun, Cyber Digital Plaza and Fountain Plaza.

As the economic center in Xinjiang, Ürümqi has expanded its urban area since the 1990s. The CBDs in the city increased rapidly all around the major districts. Despite the old city areas being primarily in the south, the development in the north part began since the late 1980s. The completion of the new office tower for Ürümqi Municipal Government in 2003 at Nanhu Square in Nanhu Road marked a shift of the city center to the north. Lacking a subway, the city commenced the construction of viaducts for Outer Ring Road since 2003, which considerably facilitates transport. Youhao Road and surrounding neighborhood, is the commercial center for business, shopping and amusement. Youhao Group, the namesake local enterprise, owns a major market share of retails. Maison Mode Urumqi, open since 2008, became one of the few notable department stores for luxury merchandise in the city. The Ürümqi Economic and Technological Development Zone (UETD) located in the northern Toutunhe District, has been a leading base for steel, machinery manufacturing, biochemistry and other industrial innovations.

Tourism 

 Grand Bazaar, a bazaar on South Jiefang Road.
 Hong Shan (Red Mountain) is the symbol of Ürümqi, located in Hongshan Park.
 People's Park, south of Hongshan Park.
 People's Square
 Nanhu Square
 Xinjiang Uygur Autonomous Region Museum, which was completely rebuilt in the early 2000s.
 Heavenly Lake Scenic Area, a popular park with some of China's most famous alpine scenery, over two hours outside Ürümqi.
 Xinjiang Silk Road Museum is located next to the Grand Bazaar at No. 160 Shengli Road. It is located on the fourth and fifth floors of a large European-style building which houses a shopping complex as well. Most of the exhibits have English names as well and some of the guides speak some English.
 Ürümqi City Museum is located at South Nanhu Road 123.
 Ürümqi Tatar Mosque is located on Jiefang Road. Permission must be obtained prior to visiting the mosque.
 The monument at the Geographical Center of Asian Continent, in Yongfeng Township, Ürümqi County
 Ürümqi Silk Road Ski Resort is located in Ürümqi County.
Immaculate Conception Cathedral, Ürümqi: Diocesan Cathedral of the Diocese of Xinjiang (烏魯木齊天主教堂)

Education and science 

Ürümqi has many educational campuses including Xinjiang University, Xinjiang Normal University, Xinjiang Agricultural University, Xinjiang Medical University and many others.

Universities 
 Xinjiang University
 Xinjiang Normal University
 Xinjiang Agricultural University
 Xinjiang Arts Institute
 Xinjiang University of Finance and Economics
 Ürümqi Vocational University
 Xinjiang Vocational and Technical Institute
 Xinjiang Medical University

High schools 
 Ürümqi No.1 High School
 Bingtuan No.2 Middle School
 Bayi Senior High School of Ürümqi
 No.70 Senior High School of Ürümqi
 No.8 Senior High School of Ürümqi
 No.6 Senior High School of Ürümqi

Research institutes
 Xinjiang Astronomical Observatory
 The Xingjiang Technical Institute of Physics & Chemistry.CAS
 Xingjiang Institute of Ecology and Geography

Transportation

Air 
Ürümqi is served by the Ürümqi Diwopu International Airport. It is a hub for China Southern Airlines. Ürümqi Diwopu International Airport is the largest airport in Xinjiang, and the only airport in China to serve flights from Afghanistan, Kyrgyzstan and Tajikistan.

Rail 
Ürümqi is Xinjiang's main rail hub with two primary railway stations, the older Ürümqi South railway station (formerly the Urumqi railway station) and Ürümqi railway station opened in July 2016. The Lanzhou-Xinjiang High Speed Railway stops at both stations, running from Ürümqi to Lanzhou railway station, and has been in operation since the end of 2014.

The city is served by several conventional rail lines. Ürümqi is the western terminus of the Lanzhou–Xinjiang (Lanxin) and Ürümqi–Dzungaria (Wuzhun) Railway, and the eastern terminus of the Northern Xinjiang (Beijiang) and the Second Ürümqi–Jinghe railway. The Beijiang and the Lanxin Lines form part of the Trans-Eurasian Continental Railway, which runs from Rotterdam through the Alataw Pass on the Kazakhstan border to Ürümqi and on to Lanzhou and Lianyungang.

Road 

 China National Highway 216
 China National Highway 312
 China National Highway 314

Many roads to the north and west typically shut down by early October, remaining closed until the end of winter.

Bus rapid transit 
The Ürümqi BRT bus service was launched in August 2011 after an investment of 930 million yuan in an effort to improve urban traffic. There are currently 9 routes operated, BRT1, BRT2, BRT3, BRT4, BRT5, BRT 6, its branch BRT 61, BRT 7, and its branch BRT 71.

Metro 
The Ürümqi Metro opened on 25 October 2018, when the northern section of Line 1 was opened to the public. The southern section of Line 1 opened on 28 June 2019. It is fully underground.

The planned system consists of 7 lines being  in length. The first two lines, Line 1 and Line 2 will be constructed with an estimated cost of 31.24 billion yuan.

Media 
The Xinjiang Networking Transmission Limited operates the Ürümqi People's Broadcasting Station and the Xinjiang People Broadcasting Station, broadcasting in the Mandarin, Uyghur, Kazakh, Mongolian, Russian and the Kyrgyz languages.

The Xinjiang Television Station (XJTV), located in Ürümqi, is the major TV broadcasting station in the Xinjiang Uyghur Autonomous Region. The local television station for Ürümqi city is Ürümqi Television Station (UTV).

Sport 
 Xinjiang Flying Tigers is a basketball team that is part of the Chinese Basketball Association, based in Ürümqi, Xinjiang. Its corporate sponsor is Xinjiang Guanghui Group.
 Xinjiang Tianshan Leopard F.C. is a local football team in the China League One.

China started a bandy development programme by organizing educational days in Ürümqi in June 2009.

In 2015, an indoor speed skating arena was opened.

Twin towns and sister cities 

Ürümqi is twinned with:

Almaty is a state-level city of Kazakhstan

Notable people
 Dilraba Dilmurat
 Gulnazar
 Rushan Abbas
 Hassan Anvar
 Elnigar Iltebir

Notes

References

Citations

Sources

Further reading 
 Lattimore, Owen . 1973. "Return to China's Northern Frontier." The Geographical Journal 139(2):233–42.
Zang, Xiaowei. 2013. "Ethnic variation in network composition in Ürümchi: do state policies matter?" Ethnic and Racial Studies 36(1):179–98. .

External links 

 

 
Populated places along the Silk Road
Cities in Central Asia
Populated places in Xinjiang
Provincial capitals in China
Prefecture-level divisions of Xinjiang
Populated places established in the 18th century